Hagel is a German surname.  Notable people with the surname include:

 Brandon Hagel (born 1998), Canadian ice hockey player
Catherine Hagel (1894–2008), American supercentenarian
Chuck Hagel (born 1946), former American Secretary of Defense ("SecDef") 
Frank Hagel (born 1933), American painter and sculptor
Glenn Hagel (born 1949), Canadian politician
Jenny Hagel, American comedy writer
John Hagel III, author and former consultant
Kyle Hagel (born 1985), Canadian ice hockey player
Lawrence Bain Hagel (born 1947), United States federal judge
Manuel Hagel (born 1988), German politician
Otto Hagel (1909–1973), German-born American photographer and filmmaker

See also
Hegel (disambiguation)

German-language surnames
Surnames from nicknames